Fulgoraria hamillei is a species of sea snail, a marine gastropod mollusk in the family Volutidae, the volutes.

Subspecies
 Fulgoraria hamillei hamillei (Crosse, 1869)
 Fulgoraria hamillei huberi Thach, 2020

Description

Distribution

References

External links
 Crosse H. (1869). Description d'une nouvelle espèce de Voluta. Journal de Conchyliologie. 17(3): 268

Volutidae
Gastropods described in 1869